Caledonia was launched in Philadelphia in 1779, possibly under another name. Caledonia first appeared in British records in 1800. She traded with the Baltic and Canada. Then in 1814 United States privateers captured her twice. The first time the privateer released Caledonia; the second time the Royal Navy recaptured her. She returned to trading with Canada until she was wrecked in September 1824.

Career
Caledonia first appeared in Lloyd's Register (LR) in 1800.

1814
The privateer did not retain Caledonia, which returned to Glasgow. On 2 July Caledonia sailed from Cork for Quebec. Later, she encountered a United States privateer, of six guns and 140 men. Surprize had captured six merchantmen. She burnt two, sent two to the United States (one of them being Caledonia, M'Farlane, master), and released two.

However,  recaptured Caledonian on 22 September, and sent her into Halifax, where she arrived on 26 September. The Vice admiralty court at Halifax, Nova Scotia showed Caledonia, William Macfarlane, master, as having been on her way from Greenock to Montreal with a cargo of wheat, bread, and coals. Still, Surprise had plundered Caledonia of 150 packets of her cargo.

Later years
Early in 1815 Caledonia, M'Farlane, master, arrived at Quebec from Halifax. On 20 September she arrived in the Clyde from Miramichi Bay.

In 1819 Caledonia was rebuilt in Alloa and registered there.

Fate
Caledonia, of Alloa, Lindsay, master, was one of three vessels wrecked on 18 September 1824 in Miramichi Bay. The crews were rescued. The wrecked vessels were later condemned and sold.

Citations

References
 

1779 ships
Ships built in Philadelphia
Age of Sail merchant ships of England
Captured ships
Maritime incidents in September 1824